Facelina lineata is a species of sea slug, an aeolid nudibranch, a marine gastropod mollusc in the family Facelinidae.

Distribution
This species has been reported from Tanzania and India.

References

Facelinidae